Ross University may refer to:

 Ross University School of Medicine, a medical school offering the Doctor of Medicine degree
 Ross University School of Veterinary Medicine, a veterinary school in St. Kitts offering the Doctor of Veterinary Medicine degree